So Early in the Spring may refer to:

 So Early in the Spring (Pentangle album), 1989
 So Early in the Spring (Judy Collins album), 1977